The Cignal HD Spikers are a professional men's volleyball team in the Philippines.  The club is owned by Cignal TV, Inc., a subsidiary of MediaQuest Holdings, Inc., a PLDT company.

Current roster 

Coaching staff
 Head coach: Dexter Clamor
 Assistant coach: Hershel Ramos

Team staff
 Team manager: Jose Christopher Cadua
 Team utility: 

Medical staff
 Team physician: Alvin Dumalog
 Physical therapist: Arjuna Cubes

Previous rosters 

Coaching staff
 Head coach: Dexter Clamor
 Assistant coach: Hershel Ramos

Team staff
 Team manager: Jose Christopher Cadua
 Team utility: 

Medical staff
 Team physician: Alvin Dumalog
 Physical therapist: Arjuna Cubes

Coaching staff
 Head coach: Oliver Almadro
 Assistant coach: Dexter Clamor

Team staff
 Team manager: Jose Christopher Cadua
 Team utility: 

Medical staff
 Team physician: Alvin Dumalog
 Physical therapist: Arjuna Cubes

Coaching staff
 Head coach: Oliver Almadro
 Assistant coach: Dexter Clamor

Team Staff
 Team Manager: Jose Christopher Cadua
 Team Utility: 

Medical Staff
 Team Physician: Alvin Dumalog
 Physical Therapist: Arjuna Cubes

Coaching staff
 Head coach: Oliver Almadro
 Assistant coach(s): Dexter Clamor

Team Staff
 Team Manager: Jose Christopher Cadua
 Team Utility: 

Medical Staff
 Team Physician: Alvin Dumalog
 Physical Therapist: Arjuna Cubes

Coaching staff
 Head coach: Oliver Almadro
 Assistant coach(s): Dexter Clamor

Team Staff
 Team Manager: Jose Christopher Cadua
 Team Utility: 

Medical Staff
 Team Physician: Alvin Dumalog
 Physical Therapist: Arjuna Cubes

Coaching staff
 Head coach: Michael Cariño
 Assistant coach(s): Sammy Acaylar,  Dexter Clamor

Team Staff
 Team Manager: Jose Christopher Cadua
 Team Utility: 

Medical Staff
 Team Physician: Alvin Dumalog
 Physical Therapist: Arjuna Cubes

Coaching staff
 Head coach: Michael Cariño
 Assistant coach(s): Sinfronio Acaylar

Team Staff
 Team Manager:
 Team Utility: 

Medical Staff
 Team Physician:
 Physical Therapist:

Philippine SuperLiga rosters 

For the 2015 PSL Beach Volleyball Challenge Cup:

Coaching staff
 Head coach: Sinfronio Acaylar
 Assistant coach(s):

Team Staff
 Team Manager:
 Team Utility: 

Medical Staff
 Team Physician:
 Physical Therapist:

For the 2014 PSL Grand Prix Conference:

Coaching staff
 Head coach: Michael Cariño
 Assistant coach(s): Sinfronio Acaylar,  Marcelo Joaquin Jr.

Team Staff
 Team Manager: Jose Christopher Cadua
 Team Utility: 

Medical Staff
 Team Physician: Ma. Josephine Gonzaga
 Physical Therapist: Ayana Gamboa

Honors

Team
Spikers' Turf/Premier Volleyball League:

Philippine Superliga:

Others:

Individual
Spikers' Turf:

Premier Volleyball League:

Philippine SuperLiga:

PNVF Champions League:

Team captains
  Dexter Clamor (2014)
  Jay dela Cruz (2014 – 2016)
  Herschel Ramos (2016)
  Ysay Marasigan (2017 - present)

Coaches
 Michael Cariño (2014–2016)
 Oliver Almadro (2017–2018)
 Dexter Clamor (2019–present)

See also
 Cignal HD Spikers (women's team)
 PLDT Home Fibr Hitters (men's team)
 PLDT Home Fibr Hitters (women's team)

References

Spikers' Turf
Volleyball clubs established in 2013
Men's volleyball teams in the Philippines